Buena Vista is a populated place situated in Graham County, Arizona, United States.

References

Populated places in Graham County, Arizona